Claudia Cuic (born 5 August 1989) is a Romanian basketball player. She competed in the 2020 Summer Olympics.

References

External links
 

1989 births
Living people
Sportspeople from Satu Mare
Romanian women's basketball players
3x3 basketball players at the 2020 Summer Olympics
Olympic 3x3 basketball players of Romania
Romanian women's 3x3 basketball players
Galatasaray S.K. (women's basketball) players